This is a list of women artists who were born in the Czech Republic or Czechoslovakia or whose artworks are closely associated with those countries.

B
Edith Birkin (1927–2018), painter 
Helena Bochořáková-Dittrichová (1894–1980), graphic artist
Zdenka Braunerová (1858–1934), landscape painter

C
Anna Chromý (born 1940), painter, sculptor
Zuzana Čížková (born 1982), sculptor, painter

D
Anna Daučíková (born 1950), visual artist
Dorrit Dekk (1917–2014), graphic designer, printmaker and painter
Tamara Divišková (born 1934), ceramist
Hana Dostalová (1890–1981), painter, illustrator, textile and glass designer

E
Helena Emingerová (1858–1943), visual artist

F
Felicita Frai (1909–2010), painter

H
Helga Hošková-Weissová (born 1929), painter

J
Irena Jůzová (born 1965), sculptor
Věra Janoušková (1922–2010), sculptor, painter, graphic artist

K
Mary Louisa Kirschner (1852–1931), painter, glass artist 
Marian Korn (1914–1987), printmaker
Věra Kotasová (1939–2019), painter, printmaker
Zuzana Kralova (born 1985), fashion designer
Alena Kupčíková (born 1976), contemporary artist
Martina Krupičková (born 1975), painter

L
Hermine Laucota (1853–1931), painter, engraver

M
Amalie Mánesová (1817–1883), painter
Adéla Matasová (born 1940), sculptor
Alena Matejka (born 1966), sculptor
Galina Miklínová (born 1970), illustrator, cartoonist
Jaroslava Muchová (1909–1986), painter

P
Květa Pacovská (born 1928), painter, illustrator
Michaela Pavlátová (born 1961), animator
Charlotte Piepenhagen-Mohr (1821–1902), painter
Miluše Poupětová (born 1963), painter

R
Kamila B. Richter (born 1976), internet artist, painter, media artist

S
Malva Schalek (1882–1945), painter
Jaroslava Severová (born 1942), printmaker
Adriena Šimotová (1926–2014), painter, graphic artist, installation art
Trude Sojka (1909–2007), painter, sculptor
Milena Šoltészová (born 1939), printmaker
Jitka Štenclová (born 1952), painter, textile artist
Hana Storchová (born 1936), painter, printmaker
Libuše Stratilová (1933–2001), painter, printmaker 
Eva Švankmajerová (1940–2005), surrealist artist
Naděžda Synecká (1926–2021), printmaker

T
Toyen (1902–1980), painter, drafter, illustrator, surrealist artist

V
Sonja Vectomov (born 1957), sculptor
Věra Vovsová (1912–1998), painter

W
Julie Wimmer (born 1975), designer

Z
Helen Zelezny-Scholz (1882–1974), sculptor
Ludmila Zeman (born 1947), Czech-Canadian animator
Kamila Ženatá (born 1953), video art, installations
Helena Zmatlíková (1923–2005), illustrator

-
Czech women artists, List of
Artists
Artists